= Sydney Eddison =

American poet and horticulturist

Sydney Eddison is an American poet, author, and horticulturalist.

In June 2022, Eddison was awarded the Gustav A.L. Mehlquist Award by The Connecticut Horticulture Society.

== Publications ==
- A Patchwork Garden: Unexpected Pleasures from a Country Garden (Houghton Mifflin Harcourt, 1992)
- A Passion for Daylilies: The Flowers and the People (Houghton Mifflin Harcourt, 1993)
- The Unsung Season: Gardens and Gardeners in Winter (Houghton, 1995)
- The Self-Taught Gardener: Lessons from a Country Garden (Viking Books, 1997)
- A Gardener's Palette: The Ultimate Garden Plant Planner (Houghton Mifflin Harcourt, 1998)
- A Year at North Hill: Four Seasons in a Vermont Garden (Houghton Mifflin Harcourt, 1999)
- Gardening for a Lifetime: How to Garden Wiser as You Grow Older (Timber Press, 2010)
- Gardens of Awe and Folly: A Traveler's Journal on the Meaning of Life and Gardening (Tilbury House Publishers, 2016)
- Fragments of Time: Poems of Gratitude for Everyday Miracles (2016)
